Al-Najda Sport Club, is an Iraqi football team based in Baghdad, that plays in the Iraq Division Two.

History
Before the foundation of Al-Najda Sport Club, there was another football team, similarly named Shortat Al-Najda, which was founded in 1960, and was affiliated with the Iraqi Police. In 1974, Shortat Al-Najda and the other Police teams were replaced in the top-flight by Al-Shorta Sports Club after the foundation of the National Clubs First Division.

Shortat Al-Najda participated in non-IFA competitions such as the Armed Forces League from 1974 until the early 1980s when the team disbanded. In 2005, Al-Najda SC was founded.

Managerial history
 Bahaa Kadhim

See also 
 2016–17 Iraq FA Cup

References

External links
 Al-Najda SC on Goalzz.com
 Iraq Clubs- Foundation Dates

2005 establishments in Iraq
Association football clubs established in 2005
Football clubs in Baghdad